David Palmer McCagg (born March 13, 1958) is an American former competition swimmer, world champion, and world record-holder.  He was the 100 metres freestyle champion at the 1978 World Aquatics Championships in West Berlin.

Early life
McCagg graduated from Cypress Lake High School in 1976. He was a student at Auburn University, where he swam for the Auburn Tigers swimming and diving team.

Swimming career
He won four gold medals at the 1978 and 1982 world championships, and another three gold medals at the 1979 Pan American Games.

After swimming
McCagg currently resides in Florida. He runs a company that develops devices to assist swimmers.

See also
 List of Auburn University people
 List of World Aquatics Championships medalists in swimming (men)
 World record progression 4 × 100 metres freestyle relay

References

External links
Auburn Men's Swimming & Diving All-Time All-Americans
Harvard Men's Swimming & Diving
GMX7 Training: X-1 Pro

Living people
American male freestyle swimmers
Auburn Tigers men's swimmers
Swimmers at the 1979 Pan American Games
World Aquatics Championships medalists in swimming
Pan American Games gold medalists for the United States
Pan American Games medalists in swimming
Medalists at the 1979 Pan American Games
1958 births